The city of San Ignacio is one of the thirteen provinces that make up the Department of Cajamarca, under the administration of the regional government of Cajamarca, in Peru. It bordered on the north by the province of Zamora Chinchipe (Ecuador); on the east by the Department of Amazonas; on the south by the province of Jaen; on the west by the Department of Piura. It is known as the land of coffee, honey and natural forests. Its population by economic activity agriculture which is based exclusively to coffee.

History
In 1926, the negotiations for the creation of the province of San Ignacio for the effect of which was assigned a commission to travel to Lima began; the same that was composed by Father Juan Cabrera Arias, Donovan Bartolini Rangel and Luis Manuel Soto Adrianzén Salary Huaman, who appeared before the military junta led by Major General Ricardo Perez. The May 12, 1965, by Law No. 15560 created the province during the first government of President Fernando Belaunde.

References

See also
2005 northern Peru earthquake
Cajamarca Region

Populated places in the Cajamarca Region